Pyrenaria buisanensis (common name: Wuwei camellia) is a species of tea endemic to Taiwan. It was first described by the Japanese botanist S. Sasaki in 1931, but the herbarium specimens were lost and the species identity remained dubious until a 2004 publication that reported its rediscovery and reclassified it as a species of Pyrenaria. Its status remains controversial, with some sources including in Pyrenaria microcarpa.

Description
Bark is brown-reddish with thin and irregular slices. The leaves are alternate, more or less clustered, thick-coriaceous, elliptic or obovate and typically measure , occasionally longer. The flowers are axillary and solitary. The corolla is white to pale-yellow and measures  in diameter.

The flowers can be used for making tea.

Habitat and conservation
This species is known from only three localities in Pingtung County, southern Taiwan. It grows at forest edges and on mountain ridges at elevations below .  Only about 35–40 mature trees are known to exist. In the past, it has greatly suffered from logging. Current threats include weather damage, collection for firewood, and potentially collection into horticulture.

References

Further reading
 Camellia buisanensis Sasaki, Transactions of the Natural History Society of Formosa 21: 222. 1931.  (Trans. Nat. Hist. Soc. Formos., 台灣博物學會會報)
 Thea buisanensis (Sasaki) Metcalf, Lingnan science journal 12(1): 180. 1933.  (Lingnan Sci. J.)
 Camelliastrum buisanensis (Sasaki) Nakai, Journal of Japanese Botany 16: 700. 1940.  (J. Jpn. Bot., 植物硏究雑誌)
 Camellia sinensis (L.) O. Kuntze ssp. buisanensis (Sasaki) Lu & Yang, Quarterly journal of Chinese forestry 20(1): 106. 1987. (excluding descriptions, figures, neotype: Pingtun.  (Quart. J. Chin. For., 中華林學季刊)
 Tutcheria taiwanica H. T. Chang & S. X. Ren, Acta Scientiarum Naturalium Universitatis Sunyatseni 30(1): 71. 1991.  (Acta Sci. Nat. Univ. Sunyatseni, 中山大學學報. 自然科學版) 
 Yang. 1982. A list of plants in Taiwan (台灣植物名彙).

Theaceae
Endemic flora of Taiwan
Trees of Taiwan
Plants described in 1931